The 1998 Arizona Diamondbacks season was the Diamondbacks' inaugural season. They looked to contend in what was a strong National League Western Division. They finished the season 33 games behind the National League Champion San Diego Padres with a record of 65–97, last in the division.

Jeff Suppan was the last player from the inaugural team still active in Major League Baseball when he retired in 2012.

Offseason
 February 7, 1997: Mark Davis was signed as a free agent with the Arizona Diamondbacks.
 August 14, 1997: Mark Davis was sent to the Milwaukee Brewers by the Arizona Diamondbacks as part of a conditional deal.
 November 17, 1997: Jay Bell signed as a free agent with the Arizona Diamondbacks.
 November 18, 1997: Devon White was traded by the Florida Marlins to the Arizona Diamondbacks for Jesus Martinez (minors).
 November 18, 1997: Travis Fryman was traded by the Detroit Tigers to the Arizona Diamondbacks for Gabe Alvarez, Joe Randa, and Matt Drews (minors).
 December 1, 1997: Matt Williams was traded by the Cleveland Indians to the Arizona Diamondbacks for Travis Fryman, Tom Martin, and cash.
 January 8, 1998: Andy Stankiewicz signed as a free agent with the Arizona Diamondbacks.
 January 11, 1998: Mark Davis was signed as a free agent with the Arizona Diamondbacks.

Expansion Draft

Round 1

Round 2

Round 3

1996–97 MLB June drafts and minor league affiliates 

The two expansion teams set to debut in 1998, the Diamondbacks and Tampa Bay Devil Rays, had two full seasons to establish scouting and player development systems and were permitted to participate fully in the 1996 and 1997 Major League Baseball drafts. The Diamondbacks drafted 30th in both 1996 and 1997, selecting 62 players (1996) and 60 players (1997) in those drafts. The team began developing those players in a farm system with three minor-league affiliates in 1996 and four in 1997.

Among the players selected and signed by Arizona from those drafts were pitchers Brad Penny (fifth round, 1996) and Casey Fossum (seventh, 1996); infielders Alex Cintrón (36th, 1997), Jack Cust (first, 1997) and Junior Spivey (36th round, 1996); and outfielders Ron Calloway (eighth, 1997) and Jason Conti (32nd, 1996).

1996 farm system 
Visalia affiliation shared with Detroit Tigers

1997 farm system 
LEAGUE CHAMPIONS: High Desert

Regular season

Opening Day starters
 Jay Bell
 Andy Benes
 Brent Brede
 Edwin Diaz
 Jorge Fábregas
 Karim García
 Travis Lee
 Devon White
 Matt Williams

Season standings

Record vs. opponents

Notable transactions
 June 23, 1998: Alan Embree was traded by the Atlanta Braves to the Arizona Diamondbacks for Russ Springer.
 June 26, 1998: Aaron Small was selected off waivers by the Arizona Diamondbacks from the Oakland Athletics.

Roster

Game log

|- style="text-align:center; background:#fbb;"
| 1 || March 31 || Rockies || 2–9 || D. Kile || A. Benes (0–1) || || 47,484 || 0–1 || Loss 1
|- style="text-align:center; background:#fbb;"
| 2 || April 1  || Rockies || 0–6 || J. Thompson || W. Blair (0–1) || || 43,758 || 0–2 || Loss 2
|- style="text-align:center; background:#fbb;"
| 3 || April 2 || Rockies || 4–6 || P. Astacio || B. Anderson (0–1) || Dipoto || 42,876 || 0–3 || Loss 3
|- style="text-align:center; background:#fbb;"
| 4 || April 3 || Giants || 3–8 || M. Gardner || J. Suppan (0–1) || || 45,590 || 0–4 || Loss 4
|- style="text-align:center; background:#fbb;"
| 5 || April 4 || Giants || 3–5 || D. Darwin || G. Olson (0–1) || Nen || 47,047 || 0–5 || Loss 5
|- style="text-align:center; background:#cfc;"
| 6 || April 5 || Giants || 3–2 || A. Benes (1–1) || S. Estes || Rodriguez (1) || 47,593 || 1–5 || Win 1
|- style="text-align:center; background:#fbb;"
| 7 || April 7 ||@ Dodgers || 1–9 || C. Park || W. Blair (0–2) || || 52,424 || 1–6 || Loss 1
|- style="text-align:center; background:#cfc;"
| 8 || April 8 ||@ Dodgers || 3–0 || B. Anderson (1–1) || H. Nomo || Rodriguez (2) || 37,016 || 2–6 || Win 1
|- style="text-align:center; background:#fbb;"
| 9 || April 9 ||@ Dodgers || 2–7 || I. Valdez || J. Suppan (0–2) || || 39,541 || 2–7 || Loss 1
|- style="text-align:center; background:#fbb;"
| 10 ||April 10 ||@ Padres || 4–6 || D. Mecili || F. Rodriguez (0–1) || || 27,246 || 2–8 || Loss 2
|- style="text-align:center; background:#fbb;"
| 11 ||April 11 ||@ Padres || 0–7 || P. Smith || J. Adamson (0–1) || || 37,753 || 2–9 || Loss 3
|- style="text-align:center; background:#fbb;"
| 12 ||April 12 ||@ Padres || 2–4 || J. Hamilton || W. Blair (0–3) || Hoffman || 26,217 || 2–10 || Loss 4
|- style="text-align:center; background:#fbb;"
| 13 ||April 13 ||@ Padres || 0–1 || A. Ashby || B. Anderson (1–2) || || 36,278 || 2–11 || Loss 5
|- style="text-align:center; background:#fbb;"
| 14 ||April 14 ||@ Cardinals || 5–15 || M. Bushy || C. Sodowsky (0–1) || || 31,477 || 2–12 || Loss 6
|- style="text-align:center; background:#fbb;"
| 15 ||April 16(1) ||@ Cardinals || 4–5 || T. Stottlmyrer || J. Adamson (0–2) || Brantley ||N/A || 2–13 || Loss 7
|- style="text-align:center; background:#cfc;"
| 16 ||April 16(2) ||@ Cardinals || 8–2 || A. Benes (2–1) || D. Osborne || || 32,039 || 3–13 || Win 1
|- style="text-align:center; background:#cfc;"
| 17 ||April 17 || Marlins || 7–5 || R. Springer (1–0) || V. Darensbourgh || Rodriguez (3) ||47,401 || 4–13 || Win 2
|- style="text-align:center; background:#cfc;"
| 18 ||April 18 || Marlins || 7–5 || B. Manuel (1–0) || A. Alfonseca || Rodriguez (4) || 49,910 || 5–13 || Win 3
|- style="text-align:center; background:#fbb;"
| 19 ||April 19 || Marlins || 3–4 || B. Meadows || J. Suppan (0–3) || Stanifer || 47,339 || 5–14 || Loss 1
|- style="text-align:center; background:#cfc;"
| 20 ||April 20 || Marlins || 15–4 || C. Sodowsky (1–1) || L. Hernandez || || 45,256 || 6–14 || Win 1
|- style="text-align:center; background:#fbb;"
| 21 ||April 22 ||@ Braves || 2–5 || J. Smoltz || A. Benes (2–2) || || 30,952 || 6–15 || Loss 1
|- style="text-align:center; background:#fbb;"
| 22 ||April 23 ||@ Braves || 1–3 || T. Glavine || W. Blair (0–4) || Wohlers || 33,013 || 6–16 || Loss 2
|- style="text-align:center; background:#fbb;"
| 23 ||April 24 ||@ Braves || 5–6 || K. Ligtenberg || R. Springer (1–1) || || 41,514 || 6–17 || Loss 3
|- style="text-align:center; background:#cfc;"
| 24 ||April 25 ||@ Marlins || 4–3 (11) || S. Brow (1–0) || V. Darensbourogh || Rodriguez (5) || 28,710 || 7–17 || Win 1
|- style="text-align:center; background:#fbb;"
| 25 ||April 26 ||@ Marlins || 6–12 || E. Ludwick || J. Adamson (0–3) || || 24,782 || 7–18 || Loss 1
|- style="text-align:center; background:#fbb;"
| 26 || April 27 || Braves || 5–6 || M. Cather || O. Daal (0–1) || Wohlers || 47,410 || 7–19 || Loss 2
|- style="text-align:center; background:#fbb;"
| 27 || April 28 || Braves || 2–12 || T. Glavine || W. Blair (0–5) || || 47,593 || 7–20 || Loss 3
|-

|- style="text-align:center;"
| 26 || || || || || || || ||
|- style="text-align:center;"
| 27 || || || || || || || ||
|- style="text-align:center;"
| 28 || || || || || || || ||
|- style="text-align:center;"
| 29 || || || || || || || ||
|- style="text-align:center;"
| 30 || || || || || || || ||
|- style="text-align:center;"
| 31 || || || || || || || ||
|- style="text-align:center;"
| 32 || || || || || || || ||
|- style="text-align:center;"
| 33 || || || || || || || ||
|- style="text-align:center;"
| 34 || || || || || || || ||
|- style="text-align:center;"
| 35 || || || || || || || ||
|- style="text-align:center;"
| 36 || || || || || || || ||
|- style="text-align:center;"
| 37 || || || || || || || ||
|- style="text-align:center;"
| 38 || || || || || || || ||
|- style="text-align:center;"
| 39 || || || || || || || ||
|- style="text-align:center;"
| 40 || || || || || || || ||
|- style="text-align:center;"
| 41 || || || || || || || ||
|- style="text-align:center;"
| 42 || || || || || || || ||
|- style="text-align:center;"
| 43 || || || || || || || ||
|- style="text-align:center;"
| 44 || || || || || || || ||
|- style="text-align:center;"
| 45 || || || || || || || ||
|- style="text-align:center;"
| 46 || || || || || || || ||
|- style="text-align:center;"
| 47 || || || || || || || ||
|- style="text-align:center;"
| 48 || || || || || || || ||
|- style="text-align:center;"
| 49 || || || || || || || ||
|- style="text-align:center;"
| 50 || || || || || || || ||
|- style="text-align:center;"
| 51 || || || || || || || ||
|- style="text-align:center;"
| 52 || || || || || || || ||
|- style="text-align:center;"
| 53 || || || || || || || ||
|-

|- style="text-align:center;"
| 54 || || || || || || || ||
|- style="text-align:center;"
| 55 || || || || || || || ||
|- style="text-align:center;"
| 56 || || || || || || || ||
|- style="text-align:center;"
| 57 || || || || || || || ||
|- style="text-align:center;"
| 58 || || || || || || || ||
|- style="text-align:center;"
| 59 || || || || || || || ||
|- style="text-align:center;"
| 60 || || || || || || || ||
|- style="text-align:center;"
| 61 || || || || || || || ||
|- style="text-align:center;"
| 62 || || || || || || || ||
|- style="text-align:center;"
| 63 || || || || || || || ||
|- style="text-align:center;"
| 64 || || || || || || || ||
|- style="text-align:center;"
| 65 || || || || || || || ||
|- style="text-align:center;"
| 66 || || || || || || || ||
|- style="text-align:center;"
| 67 || || || || || || || ||
|- style="text-align:center;"
| 68 || || || || || || || ||
|- style="text-align:center;"
| 69 || || || || || || || ||
|- style="text-align:center;"
| 70 || || || || || || || ||
|- style="text-align:center;"
| 71 || || || || || || || ||
|- style="text-align:center;"
| 72 || || || || || || || ||
|- style="text-align:center;"
| 73 || || || || || || || ||
|- style="text-align:center;"
| 74 || || || || || || || ||
|- style="text-align:center;"
| 75 || || || || || || || ||
|- style="text-align:center;"
| 76 || || || || || || || ||
|- style="text-align:center;"
| 77 || || || || || || || ||
|- style="text-align:center;"
| 78 || || || || || || || ||
|- style="text-align:center;"
| 79 || || || || || || || ||
|- style="text-align:center;"
| 80 || || || || || || || ||
|-

|- style="text-align:center;"
| 81 || || || || || || || ||
|- style="text-align:center;"
| 82 || || || || || || || ||
|- style="text-align:center;"
| 83 || || || || || || || ||
|- style="text-align:center;"
| 84 || || || || || || || ||
|- style="text-align:center;"
| 85 || || || || || || || ||
|- style="text-align:center;"
| 86 || || || || || || || ||
|- style="text-align:center;"
| 87 || || || || || || || ||
|- style="text-align:center;"
| 88 || || || || || || || ||
|- style="text-align:center;"
| 89 || || || || || || || ||
|- style="text-align:center;"
| 90 || || || || || || || ||
|- style="text-align:center;"
| 91 || || || || || || || ||
|- style="text-align:center;"
| 92 || || || || || || || ||
|- style="text-align:center;"
| 93 || || || || || || || ||
|- style="text-align:center;"
| 94 || || || || || || || ||
|- style="text-align:center;"
| 95 || || || || || || || ||
|- style="text-align:center;"
| 96 || || || || || || || ||
|- style="text-align:center;"
| 97 || || || || || || || ||
|- style="text-align:center;"
| 98 || || || || || || || ||
|- style="text-align:center;"
| 99 || || || || || || || ||
|- style="text-align:center;"
| 100 || || || || || || || ||
|- style="text-align:center;"
| 101 || || || || || || || ||
|- style="text-align:center;"
| 102 || || || || || || || ||
|- style="text-align:center;"
| 103 || || || || || || || ||
|- style="text-align:center;"
| 104 || || || || || || || ||
|- style="text-align:center;"
| 105 || || || || || || || ||
|-

|- style="text-align:center;"
| 106 || || || || || || || ||
|- style="text-align:center;"
| 107 || || || || || || || ||
|- style="text-align:center;"
| 108 || || || || || || || ||
|- style="text-align:center;"
| 109 || || || || || || || ||
|- style="text-align:center;"
| 110 || || || || || || || ||
|- style="text-align:center;"
| 111 || || || || || || || ||
|- style="text-align:center;"
| 112 || || || || || || || ||
|- style="text-align:center;"
| 113 || || || || || || || ||
|- style="text-align:center;"
| 114 || || || || || || || ||
|- style="text-align:center;"
| 115 || || || || || || || ||
|- style="text-align:center;"
| 116 || || || || || || || ||
|- style="text-align:center;"
| 117 || || || || || || || ||
|- style="text-align:center;"
| 118 || || || || || || || ||
|- style="text-align:center;"
| 119 || || || || || || || ||
|- style="text-align:center;"
| 120 || || || || || || || ||
|- style="text-align:center;"
| 121 || || || || || || || ||
|- style="text-align:center;"
| 122 || || || || || || || ||
|- style="text-align:center;"
| 123 || || || || || || || ||
|- style="text-align:center;"
| 124 || || || || || || || ||
|- style="text-align:center;"
| 125 || || || || || || || ||
|- style="text-align:center;"
| 126 || || || || || || || ||
|- style="text-align:center;"
| 127 || || || || || || || ||
|- style="text-align:center;"
| 128 || || || || || || || ||
|- style="text-align:center;"
| 129 || || || || || || || ||
|- style="text-align:center;"
| 130 || || || || || || || ||
|- style="text-align:center;"
| 131 || || || || || || || ||
|- style="text-align:center;"
| 132 || || || || || || || ||
|- style="text-align:center;"
| 133 || || || || || || || ||
|- style="text-align:center;"
| 134 || || || || || || || ||
|-

|- style="text-align:center;"
| 135 || || || || || || || ||
|- style="text-align:center;"
| 136 || || || || || || || ||
|- style="text-align:center;"
| 137 || || || || || || || ||
|- style="text-align:center;"
| 138 || || || || || || || ||
|- style="text-align:center;"
| 139 || || || || || || || ||
|- style="text-align:center;"
| 140 || || || || || || || ||
|- style="text-align:center;"
| 141 || || || || || || || ||
|- style="text-align:center;"
| 142 || || || || || || || ||
|- style="text-align:center;"
| 143 || || || || || || || ||
|- style="text-align:center;"
| 144 || || || || || || || ||
|- style="text-align:center;"
| 145 || || || || || || || ||
|- style="text-align:center;"
| 146 || || || || || || || ||
|- style="text-align:center;"
| 147 || || || || || || || ||
|- style="text-align:center;"
| 148 || || || || || || || ||
|- style="text-align:center;"
| 149 || || || || || || || ||
|- style="text-align:center;"
| 150 || || || || || || || ||
|- style="text-align:center;"
| 151 || || || || || || || ||
|- style="text-align:center;"
| 152 || || || || || || || ||
|- style="text-align:center;"
| 153 || || || || || || || ||
|- style="text-align:center;"
| 154 || || || || || || || ||
|- style="text-align:center;"
| 155 || || || || || || || ||
|- style="text-align:center;"
| 156 || || || || || || || ||
|- style="text-align:center;"
| 157 || || || || || || || ||
|- style="text-align:center;"
| 158 || || || || || || || ||
|- style="text-align:center;"
| 159 || || || || || || || ||
|- style="text-align:center;"
| 160 || || || || || || || ||
|- style="text-align:center;"
| 161 || || || || || || || ||
|-

|- style="text-align:center;"
| 162 || || || || || || || ||
|-

|- style="text-align:center;"
| Legend:       = Win       = Loss       = Postponement

Player stats

Batting

Starters by positionNote: Pos = Position; G = Games played; AB = At bats; H = Hits; HR = Home runs; RBI = Runs batted in; Avg. = Batting averageOther battersNote: G = Games played; AB = At bats; H = Hits; HR = Home runs; RBI = Runs batted in; Avg. = Batting averagePitching

Starting pitchersNote: G = Games pitched; IP = Innings pitched; W = Wins; L = Losses; ERA = Earned run average; SO = Strikeouts; BB = Walks allowedOther pitchersNote: G = Games pitched; IP = Innings pitched; W = Wins; L = Losses; ERA = Earned run average; SO = Strikeouts; BB = Walks allowedRelief pitchersNote: G = Games pitched; IP = Innings pitched; W = Wins; L = Losses; SV = Saves; ERA = Earned run average; SO = Strikeouts; BB = Walks allowed''

Farm system

References

External links
 1998 Arizona Diamondbacks Statistics at Baseball Reference
 1998 Arizona Diamondbacks team page at www.baseball-almanac.com

Arizona Diamondbacks seasons
Arizona Diamondbacks Season, 1998
Inaugural Major League Baseball seasons by team
Arizonia